The 2010 Trophée des Alpilles was a professional tennis tournament played on hard courts. It was the 2nd edition of the tournament which was part of the 2010 ATP Challenger Tour. It took place in Saint-Rémy-de-Provence, France between 7 and 12 September.

ATP entrants

Seeds

 Rankings are as of August 30, 2010.

Other entrants
The following players received wildcards into the singles main draw:
  Pierre-Hugues Herbert
  Jonathan Hilaire
  Jérôme Inzerillo
  Rainer Schüttler

The following players received entry from the qualifying draw:
  George Bastl
  Olivier Charroin
  Laurynas Grigelis
  Alexandre Renard

The following players received entry as a lucky loser:
  Dorian Descloix
  Deniss Pavlovs

Champions

Singles

 Jerzy Janowicz def.  Édouard Roger-Vasselin, 3–6, 7–6(8), 7–6(6)

Doubles

 Gilles Müller /  Édouard Roger-Vasselin def.  Andis Juška /  Deniss Pavlovs, 6–0, 2–6, [13–11]

References
Official website
ITF Search

Trophee des Alpilles
Trophee des Alpilles
Trophée des Alpilles